The Mitchell Board-a-Match Teams national bridge championship is held at the fall American Contract Bridge League (ACBL) North American Bridge Championship (NABC). It is an open four session board-a-match event with two qualifying sessions and two final sessions. The event typically starts on the first Sunday of the NABC.

More formally, according to the 2004 ACBL list of "Permanent Trophies" that recognize outstanding members, "The Victor Mitchell trophy is awarded to the winners of the Open Board-a-Match Teams held at the Fall NABC." Victor "Vic" Mitchell was a member of the winning team in 1962 and 1963.

History

The event was introduced in 1946 as a men's event until 1990 when it became an open event.

An interesting situation occurred in 1977 when there were only three winners: Richard Doughty, Ron Smith and Lou Bluhm (plus these players eligible for session awards only: Bruce
Ferguson, Sidney Lazard, Leslie West and Irv Kostal). Lazard was supposed to play with Doughty but after a good first set, Lazard became ill and Kostal took his place for the evening session.
Lazard was better the next day and in his seat for the first final session. Suddenly he toppled over and was rushed to a hospital.
Meanwhile, Doughty had to find another partner and Ferguson was pressed into service. Ferguson, whose team had not qualified the previous day, was technically ineligible but was allowed to play only in the afternoon. In the evening, Doughty recruited Leslie West—his fourth partner in four sessions—and the team went on to victory by a margin of two full boards.

Winners

* Session awards only

See also
Reisinger
Sternberg Women's Board-a-Match Teams

References

Sources
 Pre-2010 winners:
 2010 winners:

External links
ACBL official website

North American Bridge Championships